Fenis may refer to:

 Fénis, a town and comune in the Aosta Valley, Italy
 Feniș, a village in the commune Gurahonț, Arad County, Romania
 Feniș, a tributary of the river Crișul Alb in Arad County, Romania
 Fenis Bently, American football coach

See also
 Feni (disambiguation)